USS John L. Hall (FFG-32), twenty-sixth ship of the Oliver Hazard Perry class of guided-missile frigates, was named for Admiral John L. Hall, Jr. (1891–1978). Her mission is to provide in-depth protection for military and merchant shipping, amphibious task forces, and underway replenishment groups.

Ordered from Bath Iron Works, Bath, Maine, on 23 January 1978 as part of the FY78 program, John L. Hall was laid down on 5 January 1981, launched on 24 July 1981, and commissioned on 26 June 1982.

Operation ROJO lasted 41 days. While underway, the ships were under the command of Destroyer Squadron 32. The operation was a great success as both ships held contact on two Soviet submarines for an extended period of time.

On 8 March 1990, John L. Hall deployed to the Mediterranean Sea. Noteworthy operations included Operation Fox Chase and Operation World Cup in which the ship successfully tracked a Soviet Victor I-class submarine for extended periods of time on both occasions. On 7 August 1990, during deployment Med 2-90 and serving with the Eisenhower Battle Group as part of the United States Sixth Fleet, USS John L. Hall, under the command of Commander Bruce P. McClure, sortied from Haifa Bay for Port Said. John L. Halls participation included "gate guard" duties to support the United Nations sanctions against Iraq and anti-air coverage for U.S. Navy assets. The ship also escorted USNS Neosho through the Straits of Bab-el-Mandeb to Djibouti for her shore bunkering before returning through the Strait to refuel the Eisenhower Battle Group in the Red Sea. During the deployment, USS John L. Hall held over 200 hours of contact time with submerged submarines using the SQR 19 towed array sonar, and over 800 hours of flight time with the LAMPS MK III SH-60B helicopter detachment from HSL-46.

On 28 August 2005, under the command of Commander David Geisler, she sailed from her home port, NS Pascagoula, Mississippi, along with sister ship Stephen W. Groves under threat from Hurricane Katrina.

In 2007, she remained active, commanded by Commander Augustus P. Bennet, assigned to Destroyer Squadron 14, and homeported at Naval Station Mayport, Florida.  In August 2008, while underway to avoid Tropical Storm Fay, the scheduled change of command occurred with Commander Derek Lavan assuming command of the vessel.

21 April 2010, seen docked in Sevastopol (UA).

On 22 June 2010, then CO Commander Herman Pfaeffle was relieved of command after striking a pier on 16 April 2010 in Batumi in the republic of Georgia

On 9 March 2012, the John L. Hall was decommissioned at Naval Station Mayport and moved to the former Philadelphia Navy Yard where it remained in the Naval Inactive Ship Maintenance Facility (NISMF) for the next decade. The hulk was subsequently sold for scrapping to International Shipbreaking Ltd of Brownsville, TX and departed under tow to the scrappers on December 6, 2022, arriving on December 19th.

References

External links 

MaritimeQuest USS John L. Hall FFG-32 pages

 

1981 ships
Oliver Hazard Perry-class frigates of the United States Navy
Ships built in Bath, Maine